Shakin' Like a Human Being is the second solo album by Canadian rock musician Kim Mitchell, released in 1986. This album was released in Canada on Alert Records and on Atlantic Records in the US. The album won the Juno Award for Album of the Year in 1987. It is Mitchell's most successful album to date, being certified triple platinum in Canada. It features the hit single "Patio Lanterns". 

The title of the album came from a repeated lyric in Mitchell's song "I Am a Wild Party", which Mitchell included in his live performances but was not released until the I Am a Wild Party (Live) album came out.

Track listing
All songs written by Kim Mitchell and Pye Dubois, unless otherwise shown.
Side one
 "Get Lucky (Boys & Girls)" – 4:04
 "In My Shoes" – 3:34
 "Alana Loves Me" – 4:08
 "Patio Lanterns" – 3:24
 "That's the Hold" – 3:59

Side two
 "In Your Arms" (Mitchell, Dubois, Todd Booth) – 4:08
 "City Girl" – 4:04
 "Easy to Tame" – 4:12
 "Cameo Spirit" – 3:32
 "Hitting the Ground" – 4:54

Personnel
Band members
Kim Mitchell – lead guitar, vocals, producer
Peter Fredette – rhythm guitar, keyboards, vocals
Robert Sinclair Wilson – bass, keyboards, vocals
Paul Delong – drums
Pye Dubois – lyrics

Additional musicians
Todd Booth – keyboards and arranging
Floyd Bell, Steve Hollingworth – additional vocals

Production
Paul Northfield – engineer, mixing
Frank Opoloko, Robert Di Gioia – assistant engineers
Bob Ludwig – mastering at Masterdisk, New York
Hugh Syme – cover design
Dimo Safari – photography
Tom Berry – executive producer

References

External links
http://www.kimmitchell.ca

1986 albums
Kim Mitchell albums
Alert Records albums
Juno Award for Album of the Year albums
Albums recorded at Le Studio
Atlantic Records albums